Armando Larrea (born 11 May 1943) is an Ecuadorian footballer. He played in six matches for the Ecuador national football team in 1963. He was also part of Ecuador's squad for the 1963 South American Championship.

References

1943 births
Living people
Ecuadorian footballers
Ecuador international footballers
Association football forwards
People from Guaranda